is a Japanese actress, voice actress, gravure idol, and occasional J-pop singer.

Biography
Reiko Chiba was born on January 8, 1975 in Fukushima Prefecture, and raised in Osaka Prefecture. She started her career as a model in 1991 before making her acting debut in the 1992 Super Sentai series Kyōryū Sentai Zyuranger as Mei/Ptera Ranger. When the series was adapted into the US version Mighty Morphin Power Rangers, it aired in Japan where Chiba, herself, re-dubbed both Ptera Ranger and the US footage of actress Amy Jo Johnson who played her character, now known as Kimberly Hart/Pink Ranger.  After the end of the series, Chiba made her J-Pop debut on April 7, 1993 as a member of Aurora Gonin Musume. She provided the vocals for the main theme song of Fatal Fury Special titled "Non Stop! One Way Love" and participated in the game's first image album, released April 1994. She also did a cameo voice appearance as herself in the anime movie Fatal Fury: The Motion Picture, performed the voice of Cham Cham in the Samurai Shodown video game series, and had a spot in the nightly radio show Akihabara Young Denkikan. Chiba retired from the entertainment industry in 1995. However, she has made several public appearances in recent years at comic and anime conventions in the United States to help promote the official US release of Zyuranger on DVD.

Personal life
When she married Tetsuhito Kirihara in 1998, her legal name became . However, she continues to be known by either her maiden name or "Chibarei" in business and other public contexts. Since her marriage and the birth of a son in 1999, Chiba has adopted a more mature public persona. She is now active as a certified yoga instructor, teaching yoga classes and issuing a series of instructional books and videos. She also continues to pose for publications such as Weekly Playboy. Chiba is also the public face of the corporation Cherrybabe, Inc.

Filmography

TV series
Kyōryū Sentai Zyuranger - Mei/Ptera Ranger (1992–1993)
 Mighty Morphin Power Rangers  (Kimberly Ann Hart/Pink Ranger via Kyōryū Sentai Zyuranger footage)
Hitotsu Yane no Shita (1993)
Minami-kun no Koibito (1993)
Ninja Sentai Kakuranger - episode 25 guest appearance Reika (1994)

TV special
Samurai Shodown: The Motion Picture - Nakoruru (1993)

Film
Fatal Fury: The Motion Picture - Herself (1994)
Super Sentai World - Ptera Ranger (1994, voice only)
Zyuden Sentai Kyoryuger vs. Go-Busters: The Great Dinosaur Battle! Farewell Our Eternal Friends - Ptera Ranger (2014, voice only)

Anime OVA
Wild 7 - Iko (1994)

Video games
Samurai Shodown - Cham Cham (1994)
The King of Fighters EX: Neo Blood - Moe Habana (2002)

References

External links
 
 
 

1975 births
Living people
Japanese women pop singers
Japanese television personalities
Japanese video game actresses
Japanese voice actresses
Models from Fukushima Prefecture
Musicians from Fukushima Prefecture
Musicians from Osaka
Voice actresses from Fukushima Prefecture
Voice actresses from Osaka
20th-century Japanese actresses
20th-century Japanese women singers
20th-century Japanese singers
21st-century Japanese actresses
21st-century Japanese women singers
21st-century Japanese singers